This is a list of newspapers in Guatemala.

Newspapers 

Prensa Libre, the second-most widely circulated newspaper in Guatemala
Al Día
Noticias Guatemala
Diario de Centro América, the nation's newspaper of public record
La Hora
El Metropolitano, based in Mixco; published twice each month
Nuestro Diario, the most widely circulated newspaper in Central America
El Periódico<ref>[http://www.elperiodico.com.gt El Periódico'''s website]</ref>Publinews, the first free daily in GuatemalaEl Quetzalteco, based in Quetzaltenango; digital only and part of Prensa LibreSiglo VeintiunoLa Voz del MigranteLa Epoca, no longer in circulationEl Gráfico, no longer in circulationEl Imparcial'', no longer in circulation

See also
 Media of Guatemala

References

Further reading

External links
 
 

Guatemala
 
Newspapers